Quackenkill (or Quacken Kill) is a hamlet in Rensselaer County, New York, United States.

History
By the 1860s the town produced argillite, wood, tank bark, and charcoal; these resources were exported to Troy.  In 1860 Quackenkill consisted of 10 houses.

See also
 New York State Route 2

References

Hamlets in Rensselaer County, New York